The Later Trần dynasty (chữ Nôm: 茹後陳；Sino-Vietnamese: Hậu Trần triều, chữ Hán: 後陳朝) was a Vietnamese dynasty, the continuous line of the Tran dynasty that led Vietnamese rebellions against the Ming Empire from between 1407 and 1413. The regime was characterized by two revolts against the Chinese Ming dynasty which had by then established its rule over Vietnam.

History

First phase (1407–1409)

The Ming conquest of Vietnam of 1406–1407 in attempt to remove Ho Quy Ly and to bring the previous Tran family back to the throne of Dai Viet, however resulted in the destruction of Dai Viet and the creation of Ming province of Jiaozhi. The Ming's chronicles said that when they did not see a Tran heir, they incorporated the Vietnamese kingdom into Ming Empire, but when Tran royal family members appeared and challenged the Ming rule, the Ming ignored them, even hunted down and executed them. The first Vietnamese uprising against the Ming Chinese rule led by Prince Tran Ngoi, the second son of the former Tran king, in 1408. The Ming emperor ordered Mu Sheng mobilized 40,000 from Yunnan, Guangxi, Guizhou and Sichuan to repress the rebellion, but was utterly defeated by Tran Ngoi's guerrilla bands of "freedom fighters." On February 23, 1409, Zhang Fu who was appointed to replaced Mu Sheng, mobilizing 8,600 boats he had captured in 1407, along with 47,000 troops, overwhelmed Tran Ngoi's 20,000 men and 600 ships in a naval battle in September 1409. While Tran Ngoi was captured in December and being delivered to Nanjing for execution, his nephew Tran Quy Khoang continued leading the struggle against the Ming dynasty. Tran Quy Khoang however, wanted to gain recognition from Yongle as the king of the Great kingdom of Annam, but Yongle ignored, killed most of his envoys, and offered him the title "Provincial civil commissioner."

Second phase and defeat (1409–1414)
Tran Quy Khoang eventually renewed his movement, rally more people into his rebellion. Zhang Fu was ordered to returned Jiaozhi to suppress the Vietnamese, and learned that Tran Quy Khoang had high ambitions in that part of the world and would not allow the Chinese emperor to dictate the destiny of his people. Zhang Fu again mobilized a strong force of 24,000, battled Tran Quy Khoang's forces in Nam Định on February 12, 1411, killed 4,500 and captured 2,000. On August 6, the Ming army under general Zhang Sheng won fiercely battle in Thanh Hóa, sank 160 vessels, captured 120 boats and killed hundreds of thousands of Vietnamese.

Outgunned and outnumbered, Tran Quy Khoang and his partisans continued fought against the superior Chinese forces by utilizing Vietnam's terrains against the Chinese regulars, and retreating into Cambodia when necessary. By end of 1413, his force lost 60% to 70% and was forced to steal food from the Chinese for survival. He, his wife, and his brother were captured by the Chinese on March 30, 1414, and was executed in Nanjing on August 16.

Monarchs
 Giản Định Đế (簡定帝), r. 1407–1409
 Trùng Quang Đế (重光帝), r. 1409–1413

References

Works cited
 
 
 
 

1413 disestablishments in Asia
15th-century disestablishments in Vietnam
Vietnamese dynasties
States and territories established in 1407
States and territories disestablished in 1413
1407 establishments in Asia
15th-century establishments in Vietnam